Cimmeria  may refer to:

Cimmeria, an ancient name of Crimea, a peninsula in the northern part of the Black Sea
Bosporan Kingdom, a polity of antiquity located on Crimea, also referred to as Cimmeria
Cimmerians, an ancient people who lived in the North Caucasus in the 8th and 7th century BC, usually associated with the ancient Cimmeria or Crimea
Cimmeria (continent), an ancient microcontinent separating the ancient Paleo-Tethys and Neo-Tethys oceans
Cimmeria (Conan), a fictional country created by Robert E. Howard for his Conan the Barbarian stories
Cimmeria (poem), by Robert E. Howard
Cimmeria, a fictional country in If on a winter's night a traveler by Italo Calvino
Cimmeria (Stargate), a fictional planet in the Stargate setting

See also
Kimmerikon, an ancient Greek town southwest of modern Kerch  
Terra Cimmeria, a region on Mars